The Murder Game is a BBC Books original novel written by Steve Lyons and based on the long-running British science fiction television series Doctor Who. It features the Second Doctor, Ben, and Polly.  The novel is notable for introducing an alien threat known as the Selachians, who reappear later in the Past Doctor Adventures.

References

External links

The Cloister Library - The Murder Game

1997 British novels
1997 science fiction novels
Past Doctor Adventures
Second Doctor novels
Novels by Steve Lyons